Alexis Tipton is an American voice actress and ADR director affiliated with Funimation. She has provided voices for English-language versions of anime series and video games. Her roles include Komaru Naegi in Danganronpa 3: The End of Hope's Peak High School, Sun Seto in My Bride Is a Mermaid, Musubi in Sekirei, Mizuki Himeji in Baka and Test, Millianna in Fairy Tail, Moka Akashiya in Rosario + Vampire, Honey in Space Dandy, Hyoka Kazakiri in A Certain Magical Index, Mina Carolina in Attack on Titan, Kurumi Tokisaki in Date A Live, Yomi Isayama in Ga-Rei: Zero, Anya Hepburn in Soul Eater Not!, Inori Yuzuriha and Mana Ouma in Guilty Crown, Kid Trunks in the Funimation dub of Dragon Ball Super, Mei Hatsume in My Hero Academia, Reze in Chainsaw Man, Karen Kurutsu in Island, Anna Schneider in Takt Op. Destiny, Iris in Fire Force and Kaguya Shinomiya in Kaguya-sama: Love Is War.

Filmography

Anime

Film

Other dubbing

Video games

References

External links
 
 
 

1989 births
American voice actresses
Living people
University of North Texas alumni
Place of birth missing (living people)
21st-century American actresses
American television actresses
American film actresses
Actresses from Dallas
Actresses from Los Angeles
People from Denton, Texas
Texas Tech University alumni
American video game actresses
American voice directors